Fibuloides elongata is a moth of the family Tortricidae. It is known from Yunnan, China.

References

Enarmoniini
Moths described in 2005